Clear Lake State Park can be one of several places:

Clear Lake State Park (California)
Clear Lake State Park (Iowa)
Clear Lake State Park (Michigan)